Spindrift Col is a col between hills in north-central Signy Island, 0.5 nautical miles (0.9 km) southeast of Spindrift Rocks. Named by United Kingdom Antarctic Place-Names Committee (UK-APC) in association with Spindrift Rocks.
 

Mountain passes of Antarctica